New Bethel Baptist Church is a historic church on Bethel Valley Road in Oak Ridge, Tennessee.

The church was built in about 1900. One of the concrete steps that leads to the church entrance is inscribed with the date "1924," but this is not thought to be an original part of the church. The property was added to the National Register of Historic Places in 1992.

The church was founded in 1851. The church ceased operation in 1942 when the land was taken over by the U.S. federal government for Manhattan Project facilities.  A large stone marker was erected behind the church in 1949 to commemorate the church and its congregation. It is inscribed "The church having been left in extended session in 1942, this monument was dedicated and the final church session closed at Memorial Day services May 29, 1949." The New Bethel Baptist Church is the only remaining structure from the pre-World War II community of Scarboro, Tennessee.

The church building is a frame, gable-front, three-bay structure with weatherboard siding, resting on a poured concrete foundation.

References

Baptist churches in Tennessee
Former churches in Tennessee
Oak Ridge National Laboratory
Churches on the National Register of Historic Places in Tennessee
Churches completed in 1924
Buildings and structures in Roane County, Tennessee
Wooden churches in Tennessee
National Register of Historic Places in Roane County, Tennessee
Religious organizations established in 1851
1851 establishments in Tennessee
1924 establishments in Tennessee